The Men's team pursuit at the 2014 Commonwealth Games, was part of the cycling programme, which took place on 24 July 2014. Australia, the winners of the 2010 Men's team pursuit, retained their title.

Qualification

Finals

Gold medal match

Bronze medal match

References

Men's team pursuit
Cycling at the Commonwealth Games – Men's team pursuit